CETIN a.s., (also known as Česká telekomunikační infrastruktura, its former name) is a Czech telecommunications company that is part of PPF Group, an international investment group formerly majority-owned by Czech billionaire Petr Kellner. The company was created as a result of the separation of O2 Czech Republic a.s. into two companies, following a decision taken at O2 Czech Republic’s general meeting on 28 April 2015. The actual separation took place on 1 June 2015. CETIN, the new company created alongside O2, now runs the fixed-line access network, the mobile access network and international telecommunication services that were previously run by the combined O2 Czech Republic.

The CETIN network takes in 38,000 km of optical cables and 20,000,000 km of metallic cable pairs throughout the Czech Republic. It covers 99.6% of the population with a mixture of GSM, UMTS, LTE and CDMA mobile technology, transmitted by 6,000 base stations, and SDH, WDM, Ethernet and IP technology at fixed locations. On an international level, CETIN owns PoP (Points of Presence) in London, Vienna, Bratislava and Frankfurt.

PPF Group decided to squeeze out CETIN’s remaining minority shareholders at CETIN’s general meeting on 3 December 2015. The shares owned by these minority shareholders therefore passed to the majority shareholder. As a result, in January 2016, PPF Group completed the acquisition of 100% of the share capital of CETIN.

CETIN became the general partner of the Prague Spring (Pražské jaro) music festival in 2016. The company introduced a new feature to the 71st year of the festival in cooperation with Prague Spring – streaming the opening concert online to locations at Kampa Park in Prague and also to eight cinemas in the Czech Republic and Slovakia.

In November 2020, CETIN signed a contract with the Swedish company Ericsson to build the next generation 5G network.

References

External links 
 CETIN website
PPF website

Telecommunications companies of the Czech Republic
Companies based in Prague
Czech brands
PPF Group